Hive Mind is the fourth studio album by American  R&B band the Internet, released on July 20, 2018 by Columbia Records. It was preceded by the singles "Roll (Burbank Funk)", "Come Over" and "La Di Da".

Release and promotion 
On April 27, 2018 the band released the single "Roll (Burbank Funk)", accompanied by a music video. On May 30, the group announced Hive Mind, to be released by Columbia Records on July 20, with the announcement accompanied by the release of the album's second promotional single, "Come Over". A music video for "Come Over" was released on June 6, serving as lead singer Syd's directorial debut. "La Di Da" was released as the album's third single on July 13.

Critical reception 

Hive Mind was met with widespread critical acclaim. At Metacritic, which assigns a normalized rating out of 100 to reviews from mainstream critics, the album received an average score of 83 based on 24 reviews. Carl Anka of NME gave the album five-out-of-five stars, claiming it to be "a towering demonstration of the collective intelligence of five artists approaching their zenith". A. Harmony of Exclaim! wrote about the band's growth saying "there are no weak links on this album: from the production to the songwriting, each Internet bandmate brings a polished, more mature sound to the fore." Jon Pareles of The New York Times praised the band's fusion of digitally processed and hand-played music, stating that the band "imperceptibly melds hand-played parts with loops and samples; whether or not it actually is, the music feels analog. Even where the drums are looped, the bass lines often drag and pull against the beat, breaking away from vamps to improvise and loosen things up."

Year-end rankings

Track listing

Personnel

The Internet
 Sydney Bennett – vocals , drums 
 Steve Lacy – guitar , bass , background vocal , drums , keyboards , synthesizer 
 Matthew Martin – keyboards , drums , synthesizer , percussion , background vocal 
 Patrick Paige – bass , keyboards 
 Christopher Smith – drums , percussion

Additional musicians
 Moonchild – horn 
 Ruben Bailey – vocal 
 Nick Green – background vocal 
 Durand Bernarr – background vocal 
 Marcus Lee – background vocal 
 Gaz – drums 
 Kari Faux – percussion

Engineers
 Sydney Bennett – recording
 Simon Berckelman – recording 
 Jonny Firth – recording 
 Matthew Martin – recording 
 Jimmy Douglass – mixing
 Dave Kutch – mastering

Charts

References

External links 
 

2018 albums
The Internet (band) albums
Columbia Records albums
Albums produced by Steve Lacy
Albums produced by Syd tha Kyd